Igal Pazi (also transliterated Yigal Pazi, born 31 December 1939) is as an Israeli Paralympic medalist, who was a member of the Israeli volleyball team between 1973-1990. He won four Paralympic medals (3 gold, 1 silver), four World Cups (2 gold, 2 silver) and four Euro Cups (1 gold, 3 bronze).

Biography 
Igal Pazi was born at Kibutz Usha (Israel), son to Rachel (Rushka) and Shmuel Pazi.

At the Six Days War Pazi served at the 78th patrol platoon of the Alexandroni reserves infantry brigade, which fought at the Golan Heights. At the Friday afternoon, June 9, 1967, Pazi stepped on a foot mine on the platoon's way to Dabashia.

Losing his right leg below the knee, Pazi was hospitalized at the Rambam hospital at Haifa, where he was cared by his future wife, the nurse Judith Cohen-Aloro. The two got married on Nov 5, 1967.

Volleyball career 

Prior to his injury, Pazi played volleyball at the Zevulun team.

A couple of years after rehabilitation, Pazi returned to the volleyball court, playing for disabled group formed at Haifa.

Pazi than joined the national disabled team, since its formation at 1973.
Other team members were Hagai Zamir, Aharon Danziger, Shlomo Eshkol, Ron Fradkin, Moshe Berblat, Gad Lanzer, Dani Giladi and Eliezer Kalina as player-coach.

With the formation of "Beit Halohem" at Tel Aviv (1974), the sport for disabled in Israel gained momentum, particularly the volleyball team, reaching unprecedented achievements.

The team also played in the "regular" league in Israel with great success.

Pazi retired from the national team at 1990.

References

External links
 The Alexandroni brigade at the Six Days War, from the brigade's website .
 An article about the national volleyball disabled team, Haaretz, 09.08.2011
 

1939 births
Living people
Israeli men's volleyball players
Israeli amputees
Jewish volleyball players
Paralympic volleyball players of Israel
Paralympic gold medalists for Israel
Paralympic silver medalists for Israel
Paralympic medalists in volleyball
Volleyball players at the 1976 Summer Paralympics
Volleyball players at the 1980 Summer Paralympics
Volleyball players at the 1984 Summer Paralympics
Volleyball players at the 1988 Summer Paralympics
Medalists at the 1976 Summer Paralympics
Medalists at the 1980 Summer Paralympics
Medalists at the 1984 Summer Paralympics
Medalists at the 1988 Summer Paralympics